Elijah Longstreet Daughtridge (January 17, 1863 – June 12, 1921) was a North Carolina politician who served as the 12th  Lieutenant Governor of North Carolina from 1913 to 1917.

Daughtridge was born near Rocky Mount, North Carolina on January 17, 1863. A farmer and Democrat, he was elected to the North Carolina House of Representatives from Edgecombe County for two terms (1901 and 1903). Daughtridge operated several businesses, was a Rocky Mount city alderman and Edgecombe County commissioner, served on the state Board of Agriculture and sat on the Board of Trustees of North Carolina State University.

He was elected Lt. Governor in 1912 with 38 percent in a three-way race. Barred from seeking a second term by the state constitution of the time, Daughtridge ran for Governor of North Carolina and lost to Thomas Bickett in the first gubernatorial primary election in state history.

References

The Political Graveyard
OurCampaigns.com
NC Manual of 1913

1863 births
1921 deaths
County commissioners in North Carolina
Lieutenant Governors of North Carolina
Democratic Party members of the North Carolina House of Representatives
People from Rocky Mount, North Carolina
Farmers from North Carolina
20th-century American politicians